Leho Pent (born 2 April 1990) is an Estonian weightlifter competing in the 94 kg category.

Leho is five times Estonian champion in Weightlifting and five times Estonian lifter of the year.
He won bronze in 2012 European U23 Weightlifting Championships and in 2013 European U23 Weightlifting Championships.
He also holds the Estonian record in the snatch in the 85 kg division.

References 

Estonian male weightlifters
Living people
1990 births